Arunima may refer to:
 Arunima Ghosh (born 1984), Indian actress
 Arunima Kumar (born 1978), Indian Kuchipudi dancer
 Arunima Lamsal, Nepalese actress
 Arunima Sharma (born 1979), Indian actress
Arunima Sinha (born 1988), Indian mountaineer